54th Infantry Regiment may refer to:

 54th Infantry Regiment (United States)
 54th Infantry Regiment (France)
 54th Infantry Regiment (Imperial Japanese Army)